Louboutins may refer to:

 Christian Louboutin, a fashion designer most renowned for his self-titled footwear label
 "Louboutins" (song), a 2009 single by Jennifer Lopez